Alec Burks (born July 20, 1991) is an American professional basketball player for the Detroit Pistons of the National Basketball Association (NBA). He was selected by the Utah Jazz as the 12th overall pick in the 2011 NBA draft. Burks primarily plays the shooting guard position.

He played for the Colorado Buffaloes men's basketball team during his college years and was most notably the school's first-ever Big 12 Conference Freshman of the Year in 2010. As a sophomore, Burks was statistically the eighteenth-best scorer in the Division I. With Colorado, he missed only a single college game. Burks also gained national attention after being selected to the Big 12 First Team in his second season with the Buffaloes. He entered the 2011 NBA draft shortly after his sophomore year, projected to be a first-round draft pick despite playing just two seasons at Colorado.

High school career
Burks attended Grandview High School, where in 2009 he was named the Gatorade Player of the Year in the state of Missouri. As a senior, he averaged 23.0 points, 6.8 rebounds, 10.2 assists and 1.6 steals per game. He was also named the Kansas City Star and Metro Sports Player of the Year during his senior year.

Prior to his senior year of high school, Burks signed with Colorado during the November 2008 signing period.

Considered a three-star recruit by 247Sports.com, Burks was listed as the No. 49 shooting guard and the No. 196 player in the nation in 2009.

College career
In his freshman year at Colorado, Burks was awarded the 2010 Big 12 Conference Freshman of the Year, while also being named in the Big 12 All-Rookie team.

In his sophomore year, he was named in the All-Big 12 first team.

In April 2011, Burks decided to forgo his two remaining eligible college years to enter the NBA draft.

Professional career

Utah Jazz (2011–2018)
Burks was selected with the 12th overall pick in the 2011 NBA draft by the Utah Jazz. On December 9, 2011, he signed his rookie scale contract with the Jazz. On October 25, 2012, the Jazz exercised their third-year team option on Burks' rookie scale contract, extending the contract through the 2013–14 season. On October 29, 2013, the Jazz exercised their fourth-year team option on Burks' rookie scale contract, extending the contract through the 2014–15 season.

On January 13, 2014, Burks scored a career-high 34 points in a 118–103 win over the Denver Nuggets.

On October 31, 2014, Burks signed a four-year, $42 million contract extension with the Jazz. On December 30, he was ruled out for the rest of the 2014–15 season due to a shoulder injury.

On December 27, 2015, Burks was ruled out for six weeks with an ankle fracture. Two days later, he elected to undergo surgery on his fractured left fibula. On April 8, 2016, he returned to action after missing 50 games with the injury. In 13 minutes off the bench, he scored 11 points on 4-of-5 shooting in a 102–99 overtime loss to the Los Angeles Clippers.

On November 1, 2016, Burks was ruled out indefinitely after undergoing an arthroscopic procedure to debride his left ankle. On January 9, 2017, he spent a day with Utah's D-League affiliate, the Salt Lake City Stars. He was reassigned to Salt Lake City on January 11, and then recalled the next day after appearing in a game for the Stars. On January 21, 2017, he came off the bench for the Jazz and scored a season-high 13 points in a season-high 18 minutes in a 109–100 win over the Indiana Pacers. Seven days later, he set a new season high with 15 points in a 102–95 loss to the Memphis Grizzlies.

On November 30, 2017, Burks scored a season-high 28 points off the bench in a 126–107 win over the Los Angeles Clippers. On December 4, 2017, he scored 27 points in a 116–69 win over the Washington Wizards for his third straight game with 20 or more—his best string since three straight 20-point games in February 2014.

On November 5, 2018, Burks scored a season-high 22 points, alongside three assists, in a 124–111 loss to the Toronto Raptors.

Cleveland Cavaliers (2018–2019)
On November 29, 2018, Burks was traded, along with two future second-round picks, to the Cleveland Cavaliers in exchange for Kyle Korver. Burks made his Cavaliers debut the next day, recording 15 points, six rebounds, four assists and two steals in a 128–95 loss to the Boston Celtics. On December 3, he made a game-winning dunk with 3.2 seconds left to give the Cavaliers a 99–97 win over the Brooklyn Nets. He also had 13 points and seven rebounds in the game. On December 7, Burks tied his season high of 22 points, alongside seven rebounds and a season-high nine assists, in a 129–110 loss to the Sacramento Kings. On January 13, 2019, he had 17 points and a season-high 13 rebounds in a 101–95 win over the Los Angeles Lakers.

Sacramento Kings (2019)
On February 7, 2019, Burks was traded to the Sacramento Kings in a three-team trade involving the Houston Rockets. He made his Kings debut a day later, recording nine points and four rebounds in a 102–96 win over the Miami Heat.

Golden State Warriors (2019–2020)
On July 11, 2019, Burks signed with the Golden State Warriors. He made his Warriors debut on October 30, recording seven points and two assists in a 121–110 loss to the Phoenix Suns. On January 20, 2020, Burks scored a season-high 33 points, alongside seven rebounds, eight assists and three blocks, in a 129–124 overtime loss to the Portland Trail Blazers. On January 30, he switched his jersey number from 8 to 20 out of respect for the late Kobe Bryant, who passed away in a helicopter crash four days earlier.

Philadelphia 76ers (2020)
On February 6, 2020, Burks was traded, alongside Glenn Robinson III, to the Philadelphia 76ers in exchange for three future second-round picks. Burks made his 76ers debut on February 11, recording two points and two assists in a 110–103 win over the Los Angeles Clippers. The 76ers faced the Boston Celtics during their first round playoff series, but they were eliminated in a four-game sweep.

New York Knicks (2020–2022)
On November 22, 2020, Burks signed a one-year, $6 million contract with the New York Knicks. He made his Knicks debut on December 23, recording 22 points, four rebounds and three assists in a 121–107 loss to the Indiana Pacers. On May 13, 2021, Burks scored a season-high 30 points, alongside ten rebounds and two assists, in a 102–98 win over the San Antonio Spurs. He helped the Knicks qualify for the playoffs for the first time since 2013, and they faced the Atlanta Hawks during their first-round series. On May 23, Burks recorded 27 points, three rebounds and four assists in a 107–105 Game 1 loss. The Knicks ended up losing the series in five games.

On August 18, 2021, Burks re-signed with the Knicks on a three-year, $30 million contract. On December 29, he scored a career-high 34 points, alongside four rebounds, two assists and three steals, in a 94–85 win over the Detroit Pistons. The Knicks failed to qualify for the playoffs during the 2021–22 season, finishing with a 37–45 record.

Detroit Pistons (2022–present)
On July 11, 2022, Burks was traded, alongside Nerlens Noel, to the Detroit Pistons in exchange for the draft rights to Nikola Radičević and a 2025 protected second-round pick. Burks made his Pistons debut on November 11, recording 17 points and two rebounds in a 121–112 loss to the New York Knicks.

Career statistics

NBA

Regular season

|-
| align="left" | 
| align="left" | Utah
| 59 || 0 || 15.9 || .429 || .333 || .727 || 2.2 || .9 || .5 || .1 || 7.2
|-
| align="left" | 
| align="left" | Utah
| 64 || 0 || 17.8 || .420 || .359 || .713 || 2.3 || 1.4 || .5 || .2 || 7.0
|-
| align="left" | 
| align="left" | Utah
| 78 || 12 || 28.1 || .457 || .350 || .748 || 3.3 || 2.7 || .9 || .2 || 14.0
|-
| align="left" | 
| align="left" | Utah
| 27 || 27 || 33.3 || .403 || .382 || .822 || 4.2 || 3.0 || .6 || .2 || 13.9
|-
| align="left" | 
| align="left" | Utah
| 31 || 3 || 25.7 || .410 || .405 || .752 || 3.5 || 2.0 || .6 || .1 || 13.3
|-
| align="left" | 
| align="left" | Utah
| 42 || 0 || 15.5 || .399 || .329 || .769 || 2.9 || .7 || .4 || .1 || 6.7
|-
| align="left" | 
| align="left" | Utah
| 64 || 1 || 16.5 || .411 || .331 || .863 || 3.0 || 1.0 || .6 || .1 || 7.7
|-
| align="left" | 
| align="left" | Utah
| 17 || 0 || 15.8 || .412 || .372 || .868 || 1.6 || 1.2 || .4 || .2 || 8.4
|-
| align="left" | 
| align="left" | Cleveland
| 34 || 24 || 28.8 || .400 || .378 || .806 || 5.5 || 2.9 || .7 || .5 || 8.4
|-
| align="left" | 
| align="left" | Sacramento
| 13 || 0 || 9.8 || .450 || .000 || .800 || 1.7 || .8 || .6 || .1 || 1.7
|-
| align="left" | 
| align="left" | Golden State
| 48 || 18 || 29.0 || .406 || .375 || .897 || 4.7 || 3.1 || 1.0 || .4 || 16.1
|-
| align="left" | 
| align="left" | Philadelphia
| 18 || 1 || 20.2 || .461 || .416 || .829 || 3.1 || 2.1 || .7 || .0 || 12.2
|-
| align="left" | 
| align="left" | New York
| 49 || 5 || 25.6 || .420 || .415 || .856 || 4.6 || 2.2 || .6 || .3 || 12.7
|-
| align="left" | 
| align="left" | New York
| 81 || 44 || 28.6 || .391 || .404 || .822 || 4.9 || 3.0 || 1.0 || .3 || 11.7
|- class="sortbottom"
| align="center" colspan="2"| Career
| 624 || 134 || 23.0 || .418 || .380 || .799 || 3.5 || 2.0 || .7 || .2 || 10.6

Playoffs

|-
| align="left" | 2012
| align="left" | Utah
| 4 || 0 || 15.8 || .250 || .000 || .857 || 2.8 || .8 || .5 || .0 || 6.5
|-
| align="left" | 2018
| align="left" | Utah
| 9 || 0 || 13.3 || .469 || .450 || .867 || 2.7 || 1.9 || .4 || .1 || 9.1
|-
| align="left" | 2020
| align="left" | Philadelphia
| 4 || 0 || 23.8 || .327 || .188 || .778 || 3.8 || 1.8 || .3 || .8 || 10.5
|-
| align="left" | 2021
| align="left" | New York
| 5 || 0 || 25.6 || .429 || .333 || .737 || 5.0 || 2.6 || .2 || .0 || 14.0
|- class="sortbottom"
| align="center" colspan="2"| Career
| 22 || 0 || 18.5 || .391 || .323 || .807 || 3.4 || 1.8 || .4 || .2 || 10.0

College

|-
|style="text-align:left;"|2009–10
|style="text-align:left;"|Colorado 
|30||30||30.2||.538||.352||.772||5.0||1.8||1.2||.4||17.1
|-
|style="text-align:left;"|2010–11
|style="text-align:left;"|Colorado
|38||37||31.4||.469||.292||.825||6.5||2.9||1.1||.3||20.5

Personal life
Burks is the son of Steve and Dina Burks. He also has an older brother, Steve Jr.

References

External links

1991 births
Living people
African-American basketball players
American men's basketball players
Basketball players from Missouri
Cleveland Cavaliers players
Colorado Buffaloes men's basketball players
Detroit Pistons players
Golden State Warriors players
New York Knicks players
People from Grandview, Missouri
Philadelphia 76ers players
Sacramento Kings players
Salt Lake City Stars players
Shooting guards
Sportspeople from the Kansas City metropolitan area
Utah Jazz draft picks
Utah Jazz players
21st-century African-American sportspeople